Neomyennis is a genus of picture-winged flies in the family Ulidiidae.

Species
Neomyennis appendiculata (Hendel, 1909)
Neomyennis cyaneiventris (Hendel, 1909)
Neomyennis nigra (Hendel, 1909)
Neomyennis zebra

References

Ulidiinae
Tephritoidea genera